Joe Flaherty is an Irish Fianna Fáil politician who has been a Teachta Dála (TD) for the Longford–Westmeath constituency since the 2020 general election. Flaherty was the only Longford-based TD to be returned at that election.

Flaherty was co-opted onto Longford County Council in 2018, and was re-elected in 2019. 

In 2020, Flaherty was criticised for writing a letter to court on behalf of three men convicted of assault, with former justice minister Charles Flanagan stating it was "dangerous" for TDs to try to "influence judicial decisions". Flaherty said he regretted writing the letter.

Flaherty is the managing director of a newspaper company. He is married and has three children.

References

External links
Joe Flaherty's page on the Fianna Fáil website

Year of birth missing (living people)
Living people
Members of the 33rd Dáil
Fianna Fáil TDs
Local councillors in County Longford
People from Mullingar